Core Sound LLC is an audio equipment manufacturer of microphones and audio electronics, primarily addressing portable recording and microphones designed using psychoacoustic principles.  Founded in 1989, it is a manufacturer of binaural microphones for binaural recording.  It also manufactures an Ambisonics first-order and second-order soundfield microphone used for virtual reality surround sound recording.

Awards
 In November 2006, Core Sound was one of 38 recipients of Pro Audio Review's PAR Excellence Award.

See also
List of microphone manufacturers

References

External links

Audio equipment manufacturers of the United States
Microphone manufacturers